Humberstone is a ghost town in the Atacama Desert of Chile. Developed for the extraction of saltpeter, it is a Chilean National Monument and part of a UNESCO World Heritage Site designated as Humberstone and Santa Laura Saltpeter Works.

History
The town was founded as "La Palma" in 1872 for workers at the adjacent potassium nitrate extraction plant of the Peruvian Nitrate Company.  James Thomas Humberstone later became the CEO of the Peruvian Nitrate Company.

See also
War of the Pacific
Humberstone and Santa Laura Saltpeter Works
List of Saltpeter works in Tarapacá and Antofagasta

Notes and references

External links

Mines in Chile
Atacama Desert
Ghost towns in South America
Populated places in Tarapacá Region
Protected areas of Tarapacá Region
National Monuments of Chile